Leptinella scariosa is a small flowering plant in the daisy family, native to Argentina, Chile, and the Falkland Islands. Its specific epithet, scariosa is derived from Latin, meaning membranous or scar-like.

References

Anthemideae
Flora of Argentina
Flora of Chile
Flora of the Falkland Islands
Plants described in 1822